"Slow It Down" is a single release by Scottish recording artist Amy Macdonald, released as the lead single from her third studio album, Life in a Beautiful Light. The song was released on 20 April 2012 and was written by Amy Macdonald and produced by Pete Wilkinson. The song entered the UK Singles Chart at number 45, her highest charting single since "This Is the Life" peaked to number 28 in 2007. The song has also charted in Austria, Belgium, Germany and Switzerland.

Background
In an interview with BBC Breakfast on 11 June 2012 she said the song was about her taking a break and slowing down her life and stopping all the manicness for a while.

Music video

The music video for the song, directed by Pip, was released on 9 May 2012. The video was shot in the province of Almería, Spain, specifically in the Tabernas Desert and Cabo de Gata-Níjar Natural Park, and features Macdonald at dusk stranded in a desert.

Synopsis
The video for "Slow It Down" begins with Macdonald and a young boy overlooking the desert, it then shows the young boy cycling across the desert he then gets off the bike and starts running across the desert, it then goes from a young boy running to a young man running across the desert, he then comes across a horse, it then shows him riding the horse across the desert, he gets off the horse and starts running again, the man then jumps off a cliff into the water before swimming back to the beach, it then shows him driving a car along a road through the desert before stopping the car at the side of the road, at the end of the video it shows Macdonald and the man overlooking the desert.

Live performances
On 2 June 2012 she performed the song in the finale of second edition of the Polish X-Factor along with Polish girlband The Chance participating in the competition.
On 8 June 2012 she performed the song on Alan Carr's Summer Specstacular. On 11 June 2012 she performed the song live on BBC Breakfast. On 16 June 2012 she performed the song on Loose Women. On 7 July 2012 she performed the song at T in the Park in the King Tut's Wah Wah Tent.

Track listing
 Digital download
 "Slow It Down" - 3:52

German 2-Track single
 "Slow It Down" - 3:52
 "Human Spirit" - 2:06

Chart performance

Release history

References

External links
Amy Macdonald - Amy Macdonald official site

2012 singles
Amy Macdonald songs
Songs written by Amy Macdonald
2012 songs
Mercury Records singles